Penske Automotive Group, Inc., headquartered in Bloomfield Hills, Michigan, is an international transportation services company that operates automotive and commercial truck dealerships principally in the United States, Canada, and Western Europe, and distributes commercial vehicles, diesel engines, gas engines, power systems and related parts and services principally in Australia and New Zealand. Additionally, PAG owns 28.9% of Penske Transportation Solutions, a business that manages a fleet of over 400,000 trucks, tractors, and trailers providing innovative transportation, supply chain, and technology solutions to North American fleets. PAG is a member of the Fortune 500, Russell 1000, and Russell 3000 indexes and is ranked among the World's Most Admired Companies by Fortune Magazine.

History
Penske Automotive was founded as United Automotive Group in 1990 by Marshall S. Cogan and was later acquired by Penske Corporation and Roger Penske in May 1999. On July 2, 2007, United Automotive Group changed its corporate name to Penske Automotive Group, Inc; and changed its ticker symbol on the NYSE to PAG.

On June 5, 2009, it was announced that Penske Automotive would purchase the Saturn brand and its assets from the bankrupt General Motors. Less than four months later, on September 30, Penske announced it would no longer acquire Saturn from GM due to manufacturing uncertainties.

External links

See also
Sytner Group
Penske Corporation

References 

Auto dealerships of the United States
Companies based in Oakland County, Michigan
Bloomfield Hills, Michigan
Companies listed on the New York Stock Exchange
AutomotiveGroup
1990 establishments in Michigan
American companies established in 1990
Retail companies established in 1990
Transport companies established in 1990
Automotive websites